Symbiosis University may refer to

Symbiosis International (Deemed University) 
Symbiosis Skills and Professional University
Symbiosis University of Applied Sciences